Bilstein were a medieval German noble family in what later became the Duchy of Westphalia with an estate (called Land Bilstein) mainly within the present region of Sauerland in Germany. Their family home was at  Bilstein Castle in the present-day town of Lennestadt. This Westphalian family of Edelherren should not be confused with the Franconian counts of Bilstein, who held estates on the River Werra and in North Hesse.

Coat of arms 
The coat of arms depicts three pales vert on a field or. On the helmet with its green and gold mantling is a golden ball with three green pales and, above it three green peacock feathers.

John I and his son, Dietrich III, of Bilstein used a seal with 3 roses on the shield.

Municipal coat of arms

People

Regents 
Henricus de Vare (Gevore)
Dietrich I
Dietrich II 
John I of Bilstein
Dietrich III
John II

Members of the family 
Godfrey of Bilstein
Henry of Bilstein, Provost of St. Severin's Church in (then) Electorate of Cologne

References

Literature 
 Johann Suibert Seibertz: Diplomatische Familiengeschichte der Dynasten und Herren im Herzogtum Westfalen. Arnsberg, 1855. pp. 1–67 digitalised publication in Seibertz, Landes- und Rechtsgeschichte

German noble families

ca:Comtes de Bilstein